First International Computer, Inc. (FIC) is a Taiwanese original equipment manufacturer and system integrator for automotive electronics and smart building controls. FIC provides design consultancy and supply chain management services for automotive electronic suppliers worldwide. FIC group has a workforce of over 5000 employees from 2 design manufacturing/assembly sites and 4 branch offices in Taiwan, Mainland China and the United States.

History
Founded in 1979 by Dr. Ming-J Chien, in Taipei, Taiwan, FIC used to be a famous computer and component manufacturer in worldwide countries from 1979~2010; And in year of 2004, Mr. Leo Chien, the son of Dr. Ming, joined the group, and contributed his expertise as COO of FIC in 2008; and in 2011, Mr. Leo Chien began to lead the group towards a new business development, with insight into the foreseeable market demand and analysis, and gradually moved the team towards the direction of automotive electronic design and manufacturing business. Throughout the years, he integrated the group's relevant technical resources in order to support the automotive electronic design business more comprehensively and became CEO of FIC in 2016. FIC is publicly listed on the Taiwan Stock Exchange (TSE 3701).

1979: Charlene Wang and Ming Chien found company as a sales agent for main frame and micro computers.
1983: The company begins assembling its first PC computer systems under the Leo brand.
1987: The company enters motherboard manufacturing with large-scale production facility in Hsien-Tien.
1989: First International begins assembling PCs with Intel processors.
1991: U.S. and European subsidiaries are opened and production of the first in-house personal computer design begins.
1994: A configuration plant is opened in the Netherlands.
1996: A manufacturing and configuration plant is opened in Austin, Texas.
1997: A plant is opened in the Czech Republic.
1998: A plant is opened in Brazil.
1999: A large scale production facility is opened in Guanzhou, in mainland China.
2002: A new manufacturing headquarters is set up in China.
2003: Created the first AIO PC and became the e-book OEM partner of Panasonic.
2004: Transformed to a Holding company as known as FICG.
2005: Became the NB ODM partner of Fujitsu Siemens.
2007: Launched 7” UMPC.
2008: Obtained the value-added notebook orders from Fujitsu.
2010: Announced reseller agreement with Tridium to provide solutions in Green House & Environmental Controls.
2011: Focus on Automotive Electronic Design Business, and Spun off the IPC BU to a new company-Ubiqconn Technology
2012: Signed a Letter of Intent on healthcare business with NTT DATA Corporation.
2014: Ubiqconn is selected as In-vehicle System Provider for 2014 FIFA World Cup in Brazil.
2016: Expands its factory-installed products in Automotive solution.
2021: FIC Green System has passed the cloud DNP3.0 certification of Taipower.

Service Categories
First International Computer services include: DMS (Design Manufacturing Service), Automotive Electronic Design and Supply Chain Management, Smart Building & Traffic IoT System integrations. For Automotive Electronics Design solutions, the design services include AR HUD design, digital instrument cluster design, OBDII design, ADAS design, car ECU design, infotainment display design, telematics design, BMS design and Smart Fleet Management.

Company Perspectives
As Computer, Communication and Consumer Electronics (3C) markets have converged, FIC has adapted and developed to become a respected producer of 3C related products. Many new and innovative products have joined the FIC range and the company is no longer simply known for its award winning range of motherboards. In 2011, FIC started to focus its core business in the fields of automotive electronic designs, smart building & traffic automation system and green energy system integration. In recent years, FIC becomes a DMS/ODM solution provider (Design Manufacturing Service) for global Tier 1 & 2 automotive suppliers.

See also
 List of companies of Taiwan

1980 establishments in Taiwan
Companies established in 1980
Electronics companies of Taiwan
Motherboard companies
Companies based in Taipei
Taiwanese brands